Sabine's spinetail (Rhaphidura sabini, sometimes spelled Raphidura sabini) is a species of swift in the family Apodidae.
It is found in Angola, Cameroon, Central African Republic, Republic of the Congo, Democratic Republic of the Congo, Ivory Coast, Equatorial Guinea, Gabon, Ghana, Guinea, Kenya, Liberia, Nigeria, Sierra Leone, Togo, and Uganda.

References

Sabine's spinetail
Birds of the Gulf of Guinea
Birds of Central Africa
Birds of West Africa
Sabine's spinetail
Sabine's spinetail
Taxonomy articles created by Polbot